M. candida  may refer to:
 Mammilloydia candida, the snowball cactus, a plant species found in Mexico
 Miltonia candida, the snow-white miltonia, an orchid species endemic to southeastern Brazil

Synonyms
 Masdevallia candida, a synonym for Masdevallia tovarensis, an orchid species endemic to northern Venezuela

See also
 Candida (disambiguation)